Rigby Limited was an Australian book publisher, based in Adelaide. Their output consisted largely, but not exclusively, of Australian subjects, especially non-fiction, by Australian writers and artists.

History

The founder
William Charles Rigby (March 1834 – 14 July 1913) was born in London. His parents had intended for him the life of a hatter, but he was attracted to bookselling, so was apprenticed to Parker & Sons of London and Oxford, where George Robertson and Samuel Mullen (both became bookshop owners in Melbourne) were fellow workers.

Thinking to make his fortune on the goldfields of Victoria, he purchased the 48-ton lugger Gem, previously associated with a yachting club at Ryde, Isle of Wight, and in 1853 set out for the colonies with his young wife Harriet and their son, her parents (Mr and Mrs Caple), sister Fanny Caple and a crew of seven, presumably including a navigator/captain; thirteen in all. A large crowd gathered at Southampton to witness the departure of the tiny craft. The voyage was long and hard, a total of 18 weeks, and at one point they were driven ashore, possibly on Kangaroo Island, but managed to get her free without damage. They entered Port Phillip Bay, sailed up the Yarra River without benefit of a pilot, and without following pratique, formalizing the voyage after the event. The crew disembarked and without waiting for their pay made off for Ballarat.

Rigby had intended the Gem for service on the Yarra, but found her unsuited to the purpose (or was frustrated by years of litigation), and eventually the little vessel was sold by auction for a fraction of her value, perhaps ending up in the South Australian coastal shipping fleet.

Rigby spent six years at the diggings without making his fortune, then moved to Adelaide, where in 1859, with five cases of stock to a total value of £229 16 7d., he opened a book shop at 53 Hindley Street, in those days the premier shopping strip. Set into the pavement in front of his shop were blue and white tiles, proclaiming "W. C. Rigby — Bookseller, Stationer, and Newsagent".
He had such an understanding of the literary tastes and commercial requirements of Adelaide that his business prospered and in 1875 he took the lease on vacant land at 74 King William Street, and erected a new building, artistically decorated with oil paintings which were periodically refreshed.

In 1901 he was able to purchase the King William Street property freehold from the Montefiore estate for £4,000.
In 1909, at age 75, Rigby retired, and the business was sold to a limited liability company, registered in September 1909, retaining the name of the founder.

He died at his home "St Heliers", 40 Third Avenue, East Adelaide, and his remains interred at the West Terrace Cemetery.

Family
His wife Harriet died on 28 November 1872. Their family included at least one son, W. J. Rigby (c. 1853 – 7 January 1894) and three daughters: Mrs A. Ringwood, of Barnard Street, North Adelaide; Mrs Max Meth; and a Miss Rigby, of East Adelaide.
At least three daughters were born in Adelaide: Ada Harriet in 1863 (she died 1865), Ada in 1866 and Lilian in 1871. Lilian married Max George Meth (c. 1862 – 11 December 1947) in 1890. A son, Max W. Rigby-Meth, was an actor in England.

Rigby Ltd

J. M. Bath joined the firm in September 1912, and the proprietors decided to realise its value, and sell the lease, while selling the business to George Fraser, of Sands & McDougall, with an eye to amalgamating the two companies. As a result of the Great War of 1914–18 nothing eventuated and on 1 May 1917 Fraser sold his shares to Bath, who negotiated a 30-year lease of the King William Street property, then in 1924 sold the building and lease to Army and Navy Stores, Ltd. In the meantime Bath secured the lease on Sandford's warehouse behind the shop, on Imperial Place, from which premises business continued to expand.

In 1932 he purchased Herbert Small's Electrolux shop adjoining at 16 Grenfell Street, and the Rundle Street branch of Cole's Book Arcade.

Bath died in 1946 and V. M. Branson took over as managing director. The company began publishing textbooks for South Australian schools, followed by books of general interest by and for Australians. Branches were opened in Melbourne, Sydney and Brisbane in the 1950s, with an up-to-date distribution centre in James Place, Adelaide. A Perth office opened in 1962. 

In 1965 Horwitz and Rigby merged to become Australia’s largest publisher.

In January 1967 Michael Page joined the company as its Publishing Manager. In 1973 the company changed owners and Branson left. During his reign the number of employees increased from 44 to over 200 and, towards the end, hundreds of new titles were published every year.

In 1977 the Paul Hamlyn Group, through its Octopus Books subsidiary, purchased 10.48 per cent of Rigby's capital from an Adelaide investor, and a takeover bid by that company, which entailed buying out the major shareholder, was opposed by the Australian Independent Publishers Association.

By 1977 Rigby had become Australia's largest book publisher.

In 1978-79 Hamlyn Group RCI (James Hardie Ltd) took over Rigby. By 1984 all Rigby staff had been dismissed. It survived "for a while" as a subdivision of Reed Elsevier.

People
John Morley Bath (c. 1880 – 3 June 1946) became company secretary around 1917 and managing director from c. 1934.

Vernon Mostyn Branson (1908 – 21 June 1992) was manager from 1946, managing director from 1950 to 1973. He was author of
V. M. Branson (1966) The Art of Ivor Hele 
V. M. Branson (1976) The Rigby Saga
V. M. Branson (1981) The Golden Years of Apex 1956–1981 
V. M. Branson, W. B. C. Rutt (1982) Lead with a Watchful Eye: The Silver Jubilee of Guide Dogs in Australia 
V. M. Branson (1983) Kooyonga 1923–1983, the Story of a Golf Club 
Trevor Goulding, V. M. Branson (1988) Landmarks of Adelaide, A Sketchbook 
Douglas Luck, V. M. Branson (1979) Sketches of Murray Bridge 
also Clare and District Sketchbook (1974), Victor Harbor and District Sketchbook (1974), Southern Vales Sketchbook (1977), . . .

Book series
 Alcheringa Series - published in association with Bill Onus's 1962 television series on ABC Television
 Australian Men of Letters
 Australian Pocket Books
 Fast Tracks
 Humphrey B. Bear Book
 Opal Young  
 Rigby Instant Books 
 Rigby Jumbo Instant Books
 Rigby Opal Books 
 Rigby Sketchbook Series
 Rigby Social Studies Series
 Rigby's Pageant of Australia
 Rigby's Reading Development Series
 Seal Books

Notes

References

Further reading
 Michael Page,"Case-study: Rigby Limited", in: Craig Munro and Robyn Sheahan-Bright, eds., Paper Empires: A History of the Book in Australia, 1946-2005, University of Queensland Press, 2006, pp. 41-43.

1859 establishments in Australia
Bookshops of Australia
Book publishing companies of Australia
Australian booksellers
Australian companies established in 1884
History of Adelaide